Braj literature is literature in Braj Bhasha, one of the Western Hindi languages developed as a literary language before the introduction of Hindustani, Urdu, and Hindi. It is often mystical in nature, related to the spiritual union of people with God, because almost all of Braj poets were considered God-realised saints and their words are thus considered as emanating from a divine source. Much of the traditional Northern Indian literature shares this trait. It literary tradition is a celebration of Lord Krishna. The Braj region has a rich legacy and the medium was mainly the literary vehicle for the poets viz. Surdas, Tulsidas, Acharya Ram Chandra Shukla, Raskhan, Amir Khusrau among others.

History
Braj Bhasha gained wider literary acceptance after Mughal emperor, Akbar, accepted it as one of the royal court's languages and liked to use it to compose poems.

Literary works in Braj Bhasha
Some major literary works in Braj Bhasha are:

 Yugala Shataka by Swami Sri Sribhatta Devacarya; known as the first 'Vani' book in Vraja Bhasha composed in the 14th century AD as a part of Nimbarka Sampradaya tradition of Radha Krishna worship.
 Vinaya Patrika by Tulsidas
 Sur Sagar by Surdas
 Buddha Charit by Acharya Ram Chandra Shukla
 Sufi poetry by Amir Khusro
 Eulogies by Kavi Bhushan
 Vrind Satsai by Vrind (1643 - 1723), court poet of ruler of Kishangarh

See also 
 Braj Bhasha

References

Further reading 
 

Hindi-language literature
Indian literature by language
Hindi-language culture
Culture of Uttar Pradesh
Rajasthani culture
Brij